César Luis Gradito Villarreal (born 1 January 1979) is an Argentine naturalized Mexican former footballer.

He arrived to Mexico in 2004 when he was transferred to F.C. Atlas, where he played until 2007. He was sent to Liga de Ascenso, where he played in clubs as Dorados and Club Tijuana. In 2010 it was announced that Gradito would return to Primera División de México with Estudiantes Tecos.

External links
  

1979 births
Living people
Argentine emigrants to Mexico
Naturalized citizens of Mexico
Argentine footballers
Mexican footballers
Liga MX players
Talleres de Córdoba footballers
Club Atlético Tigre footballers
Atlas F.C. footballers
Dorados de Sinaloa footballers
Club Tijuana footballers
Tecos F.C. footballers
Correcaminos UAT footballers
Association football midfielders
Footballers from Córdoba, Argentina